Huigobio chenhsienensis is a species of cyprinid fish found only in the Cao'ejiang and Zhujiang Rivers in China.  This species can reach a length of  SL.  It is of minor importance to local commercial fisheries.

References

Huigobio
Freshwater fish of China
Fish described in 1938